Vankov is a Bulgarian surname. Notable people with the surname include:

Petar Vankov (born 1980), Bulgarian footballer
Rosen Vankov (born 1985), Bulgarian footballer

See also
Vanko

Bulgarian-language surnames